Euxoamorpha molibdoida is a moth of the family Noctuidae. It is found in the Magallanes and Antartica Chilena Region of Chile and Ushuaia in Argentina.

Adults are on wing from December to February.

External links
 Noctuinae of Chile

Noctuinae